The first season of American/Canadian co-produced drama television series The L Word premiered on Showtime on January 18, 2004 and ended on April 11, 2004, created by Ilene Chaiken, Michele Abbot and Kathy Greenberg. The series portrayed the lives of a group of lesbians and their friends, connections, family and lovers in the trendy Greater Los Angeles, California city of West Hollywood. The series was highly popular and was Showtime's highest rated series. It was renewed for a second and third season.

Cast and characters

Episodes

Reception

Ratings
The L Word rated as Showtime's highest new show for the 2003-2004 U.S. television season. However, the series was facing competition with CBS own shows, NCIS and CSI: Miami.

Critic reviews
The show's first season was "broadcast to critical acclaim and instant popularity"; as an article from The New York Times pointed out:
Before "The L Word," lesbian characters barely existed in television. Interested viewers had to search and second-guess, playing parlor games to suss out a character's sexuality. Cagney and Lacey? Jo on "Facts of Life"? Xena and Gabrielle? Showtime's decision in January 2004 to air The L Word, which follows the lives of a group of fashionable Los Angeles lesbians, was akin to ending a drought with a monsoon. Women who had rarely seen themselves on the small screen were suddenly able to watch lesbian characters not only living complex, exciting lives, but also making love in restaurant bathrooms and in swimming pools. There was no tentative audience courtship. Instead, there was sex, raw and unbridled in that my-goodness way that only cable allows.

References

External links
The L Word Season 1  at the Internet Movie Database

The L Word
2004 American television seasons